Millchester is a rural residential town and suburb in the Charters Towers Region, Queensland, Australia.

Geography 
Although historically the town centre is on Jardine Street Street (between Macdonald Street and Palmer Road) opposite the Venus State Battery, most of that area is currently used for grazing.

The land use is a mix of residential, grazing and some quarrying.

History 
Millchester State School opened on 21 September 1874.

Charters Towers School of Distance Education opened on 27 January 1987 as part of Australia's School of the Air. When the school opened, it relied on HF radio (using six 1000 watt transmitters) to speak with the students (with one person speaking at a time), the postal system to deliver printed materials, with occasional face-to-face opportunities in the field or at "camps" held in a major town. In 2002 the school replaced radio with teleconferencing, enabling simultaneous conversations between teacher and student. From 2010 it became possible to incorporate video-conferencing.

Heritage listings 

Millchester has a number of heritage-listed sites, including:
 MacDonald Street: Venus State Battery
 Charters Towers mine shafts
 Stone kerbing, channels and footbridges of Charters Towers

Education
Millchester State School is a government primary (Prep-6) school for boys and girls at on the corner of Bluff and Phillipson Roads. In 2018, the school had an enrolment of 162 students with 15 teachers (12 full-time equivalent) and 11 non-teaching staff (8 full-time equivalent).

Charters Towers School of Distance Education is a government primary and secondary (Early Childhood-12) distance education school for boys and girls in outback locations without access to conventional schools. The teachers are at 15-23 Brisk Street in Millbank. In 2018, the school had an enrolment of 2,137 students with 70 teachers (69 full-time equivalent) and 20 non-teaching staff (18 full-time equivalent). It includes a special education program (Prep-12).

There is no conventional secondary school in Millchester. The nearest conventional secondary school is Charters Towers State High School in Charters Towers City to the north-west.

Attractions

Venus Gold Battery is a tourist attraction showcasing the gold mining history of the area. It has guided tours and video-presentations.

References

External links 

 

Suburbs of Charters Towers
Towns in Queensland
Mining towns in Queensland